Pavletić or Pavletic is a Croatian family name that may refer to:

Ivan Pavletic (born 1974), Croatian American actor, director and writer
Slavko Pavletić (1917–1945), Croatian footballer
Steven Z. Pavletic (born 1956), Croatian American medical scientist
Vlatko Pavletić (1930–2007), Croatian politician and literary critic

Croatian surnames